Hesperia lindseyi, known generally as Lindsey's skipper, is a species of grass skipper in the butterfly family Hesperiidae. Other common names include the Lindsey's branded skipper and lost-egg skipper. It is found in North America.

The MONA or Hodges number for Hesperia lindseyi is 4032.

Subspecies
These five subspecies belong to the species Hesperia lindseyi:
 Hesperia lindseyi eldorado J. Emmel, T. Emmel & Mattoon in T. Emmel, 1998
 Hesperia lindseyi lindseyi (W. Holland, 1930)
 Hesperia lindseyi macneilli J. Emmel, T. Emmel & Mattoon in T. Emmel, 1998
 Hesperia lindseyi mccorklei P. Severns & D. Severns, 2005
 Hesperia lindseyi septentrionalis J. Emmel, T. Emmel & Mattoon in T. Emmel, 1998

References

Further reading

 

Hesperiinae
Articles created by Qbugbot